Lebanon competed at the 1984 Summer Olympics in Los Angeles, United States. 22 competitors, 21 men and 1 woman, took part in 20 events in 9 sports.

Athletics

Men's Long Jump
 Ghabi Issa Khouri
 Qualification — 6.80m (→ did not advance, 27th place)

Boxing

Cycling

One cyclist represented Lebanon in 1984.

Individual road race
 Sirop Arslanian — did not finish (→ no ranking)

Fencing

Four fencers, all men, represented Lebanon in 1984.

Men's foil
 Henri Darricau
 Dany Haddad
 Yves Daniel Darricau

Men's team foil
 Henri Darricau, Yves Daniel Darricau, Dany Haddad, Michel Youssef

Judo

Shooting

Swimming

Men's 100m Freestyle
Percy Sayegh
 Heat — 1:01.88 (→ did not advance, 66th place)

Rami Kantari
 Heat — 1:01.96 (→ did not advance, 67th place)

Men's 200m Freestyle
Percy Sayegh
 Heat — 2:20.76 (→ did not advance, 55th place)

Rami Kantari
 Heat — 2:25.43 (→ did not advance, 56th place)

Men's 100m Backstroke
Ibrahim El-Baba
 Heat — 1:13.76 (→ did not advance, 44th place)

Rami Kantari
 Heat — DSQ (→ did not advance, no ranking)

Men's 100m Breaststroke
Amine El-Domyati
 Heat — 1:19.10 (→ did not advance, 50th place)

Men's 200m Breaststroke
Amine El-Domyati
 Heat — DNS (→ did not advance, no ranking)

Men's 100m Butterfly
Ibrahim El-Baba
 Heat — 1:04.48 (→ did not advance, 46th place)

Weightlifting

Wrestling

References

External links
Official Olympic Reports

Nations at the 1984 Summer Olympics
1984
1984 in Lebanese sport